Fuddu is a 2016 Indian Hindi-language romantic comedy film directed by Sunil Subramani. It is produced by Pradeep Gupta, Mahima Gupta, Gandharv Sachdev, and Pawan Kumar Sharma under the banner of Mahima Productions.

The film Stars Shubham and Swati Kapoor in lead roles, with Pritosh Sand, Shalini Arora, and Vikki Ahuja playing supporting roles. Sunny Leone was seen in a song, which is partly written by Ranbir Kapoor.

Plot
The film depicts story of Mohan, who has just arrived from Banaras to Mumbai city. He is disturbed to see how people live in cramped houses in the city of Mumbai. His entire world tilts upside down when his wife leaves him for reasons which are untrue. His family too discards him and disrespects him.

Cast 
Shubham Kumar as Mohan Mishra
Swati Kapoor as Shalini
Shalini Arora
Shakti Rawal
Gauahar Khan as item number
Sujeet Pathak
Sunny Leone and Sharman Joshi as item number Tu Zaroorat Nahi Tu Zaroori Hai

Music
Music for Fuddu is composed by Rana Majumdar and Sumeet Bellary, while the lyrics been penned by Satya Khare. On 15 September, the teaser for the first song from the movie was released titled as "Tu Zaroorat Nahi Tu Zaroori Hai" featuring Sunny Leone is sung by Shreya Ghoshal and Gandharv Sachdev, while Ranbir Kapoor narrated the shayari part; was released on 19 September. Other confirmed singer are K.K, Sunidhi Chauhan, Arijit Singh, Sumedha Karmahe, Yasser Desai & Mohit Chauhan. All the copyrights of Fuddu Soundtracks are under the label of Zee Music Company.

References

External links
 
 

2016 films
2010s Hindi-language films
2016 romantic comedy films
Indian romantic comedy films